The MV Mtendere (Chichewa for 'peace') is a ferry, which used to serve passenger and cargo service on Lake Malawi. As of 2014, it is out of service and is stored at the port of Monkey Bay. It is planned to break the ship and recycle its parts.

Former services offered by the Mtendere are now being operated by the MV Ilala.

See also

Transport in Malawi

References

Ferries
Lake Malawi
Transport in Malawi
Ships of Malawi